Aarrass is a surname. Notable people with the surname include:

Ali Aarrass, Moroccan-Belgian citizen imprisoned on charges of terrorism
Jamale Aarrass (born 1981), French middle-distance runner